Brachida is a genus of rove beetles first described in 1871.

Selected species 
 Brachida exigua Heer, 1839
 Brachida hatayana Assing, 2010
 Brachida kraatzii Hochhuth, 1872

References 

Aleocharinae
Beetles described in 1871